Not Everybody Gets a Happy Ending is the second full-length album by Die So Fluid. It was recorded at Criterion Studios, London, and released through an independent label, Parole Records, in the United Kingdom in 2008. It was distributed by Cargo Records. It was released in the USA several months later through Renaissance Recordings by KOCH Entertainment Distribution.

Track listing
Music by Die So Fluid, Lyrics by Grog

Personnel
Band
 Grog – vocals, bass
 Drew "Mr Drew" Richards – guitar
 Al Fletcher – drums
Additional Performers
 Samy Bishai - violin and string arrangement on "Throw You Away"
 Lulu Berger-Sparey - backing vocals on "Not Everybody Gets a Happy Ending"
 Stefanie Gross - spoken German on "Not Everybody Gets a Happy Ending"
Production
 Mark Williams - producer
 Pat Collier - additional engineering on "Vorvolaka", "Something to Say", and "Not Everybody Gets a Happy Ending"
 Alan Douches - mastering
 Uncle Vania - illustrations
 Shelley Hannan - design
 Paul Harries - photography
 Mia Bergius - live photography

Singles
"Happy Hallowe’en" and "Existential Baby" were released as digital singles in support of the album.

References

External links
 Album Review by Metal Hammer DE, April 2011 (Note: review in German)
 KK Downing's Steel Mill Album Review, by Kassu Kortelainen, March 2008

2008 albums
Die So Fluid albums